The Government of the Autonomous Republic of Abkhazia is an administration recognized by Georgia as the legal and only government of Abkhazia. Abkhazia has been de facto independent of Georgiathough with very little international recognitionsince the early 1990s. Ruslan Abashidze, elected in May 2019, is the current head of the government-in-exile.

After the War in Abkhazia (1992–1993) Georgia proposed five-party talks involving the Government of the Autonomous Republic, the government of the de facto authorities of Abkhazia, and the government of Georgia, along with Russia and the UN as interested parties, in order to settle the final status of Abkhazia within the framework of the Georgian state. The Abkhaz side wanted assurances that Georgia would not try to solve the issue by force of arms before being a party to the talks.

Between September 2006 and July 2008, the Georgian recognized government was headquartered in Upper Abkhazia. It was forced out of all of Abkhazia in August 2008 during the Russo-Georgian war by the Abkhazian armed forces. Upper Abkhazia is a territory that has population of c. 2,000 (1–1.5% of Abkhazia's post-war population) and is centered on the upper Kodori Valley (roughly 17% of the territory of the former Abkhaz ASSR). The government-in-exile is partly responsible for the affairs of some 250,000 internally displaced persons who were forced to leave Abkhazia following the War in Abkhazia and the resulting ethnic cleansing of Georgians from the area.

History

During the War in Abkhazia, the Government of the Autonomous Republic of Abkhazia, then called the "Council of Ministers of Abkhazia", left Abkhazia after the Abkhaz separatist forces took control of the region's capital Sukhumi after heavy fighting on September 27, 1993, leading to the Sukhumi Massacre, in which several members of the Abkhazian government of that time, including its chairman Zhiuli Shartava, were executed by the rebels. The Council of Ministers relocated to Georgia's capital Tbilisi, where it operated as the Government of Abkhazia in exile for almost 13 years. During this period, the Government of Abkhazia in exile, led by Tamaz Nadareishvili, was known for a hard-line stance towards the Abkhaz problem and frequently voiced their opinion that the solution to the conflict can only be attained through Georgia's military response to secessionism. Later, Nadareishvili's administration was implicated in some internal controversies and had not taken an active part in the politics of Abkhazia until a new chairman, Irakli Alasania, was appointed by President of Georgia, Mikheil Saakashvili. Alasania was later made Saakashvili's envoy in the peace talks over Abkhazia.

Amid the 2006 Georgian police operation in Abkhazia's Kodori Gorge, in which a local militia, led by the defiant warlord Emzar Kvitsiani, had been largely disarmed, and the constitutional order restored in the area, President Saakashvili announced, on July 27, 2006, that the authorities had decided to establish the Tbilisi-based Abkhazian government-in-exile in the Kodori Gorge (Upper Abkhazia):

During the 2008 Russo-Georgian War, the Republic of Abkhazia joined forces with the Ossetians and opened a second front against Georgia. During the Battle of the Kodori Valley Abkhazian forces loyal to the Government of the Republic of Abkhazia pushed the Government of the Autonomous Republic of Abkhazia out of the region of Abkhazia. Sergei Bagapsh, President of the Government of the Republic of Abkhazia said in an address to the Abkhazian people that "the jurisdiction of the Abkhaz state has been restored in the upper Kodori Gorge."

Executive branch

|Chairman of Cabinet of Ministers
|Ruslan Abashidze
|
|2019
|-
|Chairman of the Supreme Council
|Jemal Gamakharia
|
|2019
|-
|Deputy of Chairman of the Supreme Council
|Tamaz Khubua
|
|2019
|-
|Deputy of Chairman of the Supreme Council
|Davit Gvadzabia
|
|2019
|}

Heads of the Government

 Tamaz Nadareishvili, September 1993 – March 16, 2004
 Londer Tsaava, March 16, 2004 – September 30, 2004
 Irakli Alasania, September 30, 2004 – April 24, 2006
 Malkhaz Akishbaia, April 24, 2006 – June 11, 2009
 Giorgi Baramia, June 11, 2009 – April 5, 2013
 Vakhtang Kolbaia (acting), April 8, 2013 – May 1, 2019
 Ruslan Abashidze (acting), May 1, 2019 – present

See also
 Abkhaz Autonomous Soviet Socialist Republic
 Provisional Administrative Entity of South Ossetia

References

External links 
 Government website

Upper Abkhazia
Politics of Abkhazia
Political organizations based in Abkhazia
Abkhazia
Abkhazia
States and territories established in 1991
1991 establishments in Europe
1991 establishments in Asia
Autonomous governments in exile